USS Squall (PC-7) is the seventh . Squall was laid down 17 February 1993 by Bollinger Shipyards, Lockport, Louisiana and launched 28 August 1993. She was commissioned by the United States Navy 4 July 1994.

Operational history
In 2013, Squall shifted homeport to Naval Support Activity Bahrain.

During the encounter, the Iranian boat closed within  of the Tempest and ignored earlier warnings to leave the area conveyed by radio and loud speaker and reinforced with the firing of flares. In accordance with standard maritime procedure, the warning shots were fired into the water. The Iranian boat then left the area.

Squall was decommissioned on 14 March 2022 at Naval Support Activity Bahrain.

References

External links

FAS
navsource.org: USS Squall

 

Cyclone-class patrol ships
Ships built in Lockport, Louisiana
1993 ships